Pickled Productions, also known as "I'm A Little Pickled Theatre Company", was a theatre society in Vancouver, BC, Canada. It was founded in 2001 and closed in 2008. Its primary focus was to produce work that was rarely being performed.

Production List
Wild Abandon by Daniel MacIvor (3 production runs)
Scooter Thomas Makes It To The Top of The World by Peter Parnell
Falling Man by Will Scheffer
Six Degrees of Separation by John Guare
Vampire Lesbians of Sodom by Charles Busch
Off To See The Wizard by Randie Parliament
See Bob Run by Daniel MacIvor
The Soldier Dreams by Daniel MacIvor
The Book of Liz by David Sedaris & Amy Sedaris
Hedwig And The Angry Inch by John Cameron Mitchell
Debbie Does Dallas - The Musical by Andrew Sherman, Tom Kitt, Jonathan Callicutt & Susan L. Schwartz

Players
Randie Parliament, founder / co-artistic director
April Merrick, co-artistic director
Brenda Matthews, artistic producer
Laura Leone Hancock, artistic producer
Giles Panton, artistic producer

Awards and nominations
CTC AWARDS

2008     Debbie Does Dallas - The Musical        
Best Actress in a Musical, Jamie Robinson (Debbie)
Best Supporting Actress, Claire Lindsay (Tammy)

2007     Hedwig And The Angry Inch               
Best Production, Randie Parliament (Producer)
Best Actor in a Musical, Seth Drabinsky (Hedwig)
Best Supporting Actress, Cathy Salmond (Yitzak)
Best Supporting Actor, Edmonton Block Heater              
Best Musical Director, Mark Reid
Best Sound Design, Mark Reid & Ross Smith

2006     The Soldier Dreams                      
Best Production, Randie Parliament (Producer)
Best Actress, Christina Schild (Tish)
Best Lighting Design, Josh Hallem
    
2006     The Book of Liz, written by David Sedaris and Amy Sedaris                         
Best Actress, Brenda Matthews (Liz) - Winner!
Best Supporting Actress, April Merrick
Best Supporting Actor, Giles Panton - Winner!
Best Director, Penelope Corrin

2006     Wild Abandon
Best Actor, Randie Parliament (Steve)

OVATION AWARDS

2007     Hedwig And The Angry Inch
Best Production, Randie Parliament (Producer)
Best Actor, Seth Drabinsky - Winner
Best Supporting Actress, Cathy Salmond - Winner

2007     Debbie Does Dallas - The Musical
Best Actress, Jamie Robinson - Winner
Best Supporting Actress, Claire Lindsay
Best Choreography, Jason Franco - Winner

Review - Hedwig And The Angry Inch - Georgia Straight
Review - Hedwig And The Angry Inch - The Vancouver Sun

Theatre companies in British Columbia
Theatre in Vancouver